AskMoses.com is a defunct website that previously served people with questions about or related to Orthodox Judaism or who have a moral dilemma they wished to solve through religious beliefs. It offered live chatting and a database of questions that were previously asked. The advice was given from a strictly religious point of view, as the website's goal was to educate people in Judaism. Questions were answered by employees of Chabad of California.

30% of visitors to the site were non-Jewish. The website did not operate on the Sabbath. Many of the writings of Rabbi Simon Jacobson were syndicated on the site.

Live chat
Once the user would come onto the site's home page, they could log into the Java-based chat room. The chat time was limited by the scholar answering the question. The process was anonymous and free of charge. The director of the website was Rabbi Simcha Backman.

AskMoses.com provided "24/6" service, meaning scholars were available for chatting 24 hours a day, but take the Sabbath off. Assistance was available in English, Hebrew, Russian, Spanish and French.

Knowledgebase
In addition to live advice, AskMoses.com provided a database of answered questions on common topics relevant to Judaism, such as God, Jewish philosophy, Jewish holidays and the like.

See also
 Chabad.org

References

External links
 AskMoses.com

Chabad organizations
Judaism websites
Chabad-Lubavitch (Hasidic dynasty)
Defunct websites